Svøufallet is a waterfall in Sunndal Municipality, in Møre og Romsdal county, Norway.

The waterfall begins slowly with several smaller drops before reaching the edge of the gorge where it drops  to the river below. The waterfall is located within the Åmotan-Grøvudalen Nature Reserve.

References

Sunndal
Waterfalls of Møre og Romsdal